Dead Can Dance is the debut studio album by Australian musical act Dead Can Dance. It was released on 27 February 1984 on the 4AD label.

Background
Dead Can Dance commented on their official website regarding the name of the band and album:

To understand why we chose the name, think of the transformation of inanimacy to animacy. Think of the processes concerning life from death and death into life. So many people missed the inherent symbolic intention of the work, and assumed that we must be "morbid gothic types".

Production
The album was recorded at Blackwing Studios.

The musicians who performed on the album were Brendan Perry, Lisa Gerrard, Paul Erikson, James Pinker and Peter Ulrich.

The instrumentation consisted of guitars, bass guitar and drums, with added percussion and the very distinct sound of the yangqin, as played by Gerrard.

Musical style
AllMusic commented on the album's sound: "Bearing much more resemblance to the similarly gripping, dark early work of bands like the Cocteau Twins and the Cure than to the later fusions of music that would come to characterize the duo's sound, Dead Can Dance is as goth as it gets in many places".

Album cover
The album cover includes a photo of a piece of artwork from Papua New Guinea on the left side, and on the right, the characters "ΔΞΛΔ CΛΝ ΔΛΝCΞ", which aimed to visually resemble the title "DEAD CAN DANCE".

Release 
The album was released by 4AD on 27 February 1984. Some editions included Dead Can Dance's next release, the EP Garden of the Arcane Delights, added onto the end of the album.

Reception 

In its retrospective review, AllMusic wrote that, with the album, "Perry and Gerrard created a striking, dour landmark in early-'80s atmospherics".

Touring 
The band's touring was limited to Europe during this period.

Track listing

Release history

Personnel
Personnel adapted from Dead Can Dance liner notes.
Dead Can Dance
 Lisa Gerrard
 Brendan Perry
 Paul Erikson
 James Pinker
 Scott Roger
 Peter Ulrich

Production
 John Fryer – production

References

External links 

 
 
 

Dead Can Dance albums
1984 debut albums
Albums produced by John Fryer (producer)
4AD albums
Ethereal wave albums
Post-punk albums by Australian artists
Gothic rock albums by Australian artists